The Oxford Companion to Chess is a reference book on the game of chess written by David Vincent Hooper and Kenneth Whyld. The book is written in an encyclopedia format. The book belongs to the Oxford Companions series.

Details
The first edition of the book was published in 1984 by Oxford University Press. The second edition (1992) has over 2,500 entries, including rules, terms, strategies, tactics, over 500 brief biographies of famous players, and entries on more than 700 named openings and opening variations. In the back of the book is a comprehensive index of opening variations and sub-variations, listing 1,327 named variations.

The book also discusses chess from other countries (such as shogi), chess variants (such as three dimensional chess), and some forms of fairy chess.

Editions
 First published in 1984 by Oxford University Press
 Reissued in paperback (with corrections) in 1987 by Oxford University Press
 Second edition published in 1992 by Oxford University Press, 
 Paperback version of the second edition in 1996

References

1984 non-fiction books
1992 non-fiction books
1984 in chess
1992 in chess
Chess books
Oxford University Press reference books